William Watters (10 November 1884 – 20 August 1962) was a British gymnast. He competed in the men's artistic individual all-around event at the 1908 Summer Olympics.

References

External links
 

1884 births
1962 deaths
British male artistic gymnasts
Olympic gymnasts of Great Britain
Gymnasts at the 1908 Summer Olympics
Place of birth missing